Myklebustbreen or Snønipbreen is the seventh largest glacier in mainland Norway. It is located in the municipalities of Nordfjord, Gloppen, and Stryn in Vestland county.

The Oldedalen valley lies to the east of the glacier. The glacier also lies northwest of the large Jostedalsbreen glacier, and both are part of Jostedalsbreen National Park. Jostedalsbreen and Myklebustbreen are separated by the Stardalen valley.

See also
List of glaciers in Norway

References

External links
 The largest glaciers in Norway

Stryn
Sunnfjord
Gloppen
Glaciers of Vestland